Miguel Cárdenas may refer to:

Miguel Cárdenas (politician), Mexican politician
Miguel Cárdenas (footballer), Paraguayan footballer